Robert West "Tiny" Baldwin (February 16, 1904 – May 14, 1959) was an American baseball shortstop and second baseman in the Negro leagues. He played from 1921 to 1926 with the Cleveland Tate Stars, Indianapolis ABCs, Cleveland Elites, and Detroit Stars.

External links
 and Baseball-Reference Black Baseball Stats and Seamheads

Cleveland Tate Stars players
Indianapolis ABCs players
Cleveland Elites players
Detroit Stars players
1904 births
1959 deaths
20th-century African-American sportspeople
Baseball infielders